Henry Campbell may refer to:

Henry Dundas Campbell (c. 1798–1872), British army officer and Governor of Sierra Leone
Henry Montgomery Campbell (1887–1970), Church of England bishop
Henry Campbell (MP) (1856–1924), Irish nationalist politician
Henry Colin Campbell (died 1930), executed by the State of New Jersey for the murder of Mildred Mowry
Henry Arthur Campbell (1873–1953), Jamaican electrical engineer
Henry Frederick Campbell (1769–1856), soldier of the British Army
Henry Roe Campbell (1807–1879), American surveyor and civil engineer
Henry LeRoy Campbell (1915–2007), American football player
Henry Cummings Campbell (1919–2009), Canadian educator and librarian

See also

Harry Campbell (disambiguation)
Henry Campbell-Bannerman (1836–1908), Prime Minister of the United Kingdom